Großschwabhausen station is a railway station in the municipality of Großschwabhausen, located in the Weimarer Land district in Thuringia, Germany.

References

Railway stations in Thuringia
Buildings and structures in Weimarer Land